Bafoulabé is a town and rural commune in south-western Mali. It is located in the Region of Kayes at the confluence of the Bafing and Bakoy rivers which join to become the Sénégal River. Bafoulabé is the capital of the Cercle of Bafoulabé, which in 1887 was the first Cercle to be created in Mali.

Local administration
Until the 1996 law creating communes, Bafoulabé Commune was an arrondissement.  While now deprecated, the commune retains the same boundaries, extending far beyond the town of Bafoulabé, its seat (chef-lieu). Bafoulabé is also the seat of the larger Bafoulabé Cercle. Apart from the town, there are 28 villages, official rural subdivisions within the Commune. It is a Rural Commune, meaning it is subdivided in villages, in contrast to the smaller Urban Commune, divided into urban Quarters. Commune affairs are directed by an elected Commune Council (conseil communal) of 23 members and a Commune executive (bureau communal) of the elected Mayor and three adjutants. The executive is tasked with carrying out the directives voted by the Council.  National policies are carried out by a Sub-Prefect (sous préfet), who also carries out certain of the Council's directives over the local arms or national bodies.

Geography and climate

At Bafoulabé the Bafing and Bakoy rivers meet to form the Sénégal River. In Bambara, Bafoulabé means "meeting of two rivers".
The Manantali hydroelectric dam and its reservoir, Lake Manantali, the largest in Mali, is located 90 km to the south-east of Bafoulabé on the Bafing.

Extending across two banks of the Senegal River, the Commune is bounded to the east by Kontéla Commune and Oualia Commune, to the north Tomora Commune and Sidibéla Commune, to the south by Mahina Commune and to the west by Diamou Commune of Kayes Cercle.  The climate is Sahelian.  The June to October rainy season accounts for all the less than 900 mm of precipitation a year.  While hot year round by temperate standards, a hot season lasts from roughly February to June, and a cooler season runs from roughly November to February.  Maximum yearly temperature may reach 41 °C in the shade.

Vegetation
The Sahel landscape of the Commune is made up of grasslands punctuated by trees, often large.  These include the baobab, the rônier, raffia palm (from which textiles, rope, and palm oil is made), shea (from which Shea Butter is made), duguto, and néré trees.

Population and culture
Bafoulabé had a population of 16,670 in 1998 and 19,955 in 2009. Prior to colonialism, Bafoulabé had been a thriving commercial center. The construction of the Dakar Bamako railway in the early 20th century bypassed the river trade, making Kayes the center of commercial activity in the area.  The town's population consists primarily of Khassonkés, Malinkés, Soninkés and Fulas. Fily Dabo Sissoko, writer and one of the founding fathers of independent Mali, was a native of Bafoulabé. The Festival dansa/diawoura, a festival of traditional dance, took place in Bafoulabé from April 8 to April 10, 2005.

The legend of Mali Sadio, which concerns a hippopotamus who develops a friendship with a young lady called Sadio, takes place in Bafoulabé.

Sister cities 
 Lesquin, France

References 

 Translation of :fr:Bafoulabé.
  Le président Touré à Bafoulabé : la voie largement ouverte vers le développement.  M. COULIBALY, l'Essor n°15483 2005-06-28.

External links 
 image of the Senegal river, with Bafoulabé in the background.
 Election results: Assemblee-Nationale of Mali, Bafoulabé cercle. 
  Image gallery from 2007 visit to Bafoulabé.
  Image gallery from 2005 visit to Bafoulabé.
Commissariat à la Sécurité Alimentaire and USAID: Commune of Bafoulabé 

Communes of Kayes Region
French West Africa
Senegal River